Boreas is a 2006 Turkish short drama film, written and directed by Belma Baş, in which a child observes the rustic life of her elderly relatives in a remote old house in the mountains. The film was premiered in competition at the 59th Cannes Film Festival and was shown at the 43rd Antalya Golden Orange Film Festival, where it won the Special Jury Prize. It was the basis for the director's feature debut Zephyr (2010).

References

External links
 

2006 films
2000s Turkish-language films
2006 drama films
Films set in Turkey
Turkish drama films